Soldier of Fortune: Payback is a first-person shooter video game and the third installment of the Soldier of Fortune franchise, following Soldier of Fortune II: Double Helix. It is the first game of the series released for the Xbox 360 and PlayStation 3. The game was released on November 13, 2007. The game involves a revenge plot against a worldwide terrorist organization.

Unlike the previous two Soldier of Fortune games, which were developed by Raven Software using the id Tech 2 and id Tech 3 engines developed by id Software, Payback was developed by Cauldron HQ.

The game was met with tepid, mostly negative reviews, with many saying the game looked pretty but the gameplay was uninspired. Like the other two games in the series, Payback had great character modelling and gore effects. Owing to the level of violence, the Office of Film and Literature Classification of Australia refused to classify the game. After the game was effectively banned in Australia, a modified version was released on April 23, 2008, that removed radical violence and dismemberment.

Plot
After freelance mercenary Thomas Mason (Kyle Herbert) is betrayed by his comrade during a mission, he swears revenge against a worldwide terrorist organization that brands all of its operatives with the same tattoo on their necks.

Reception

The game was met with negative reviews. Most critics cited the great character modelling and gore effects. Jason Ocampo of GameSpot scored it a 4.5/10. He claimed that "This shooter is a great exercise in pattern memorization and trial-and-error gameplay."  He also said it "looks pretty". Jay Frechette of 1up.com scored the game a 5.5/10. Frechette said "Soldier of Fortune doesn't cross the line of being a bad game, but it hardly ever breaks the surface of mediocrity either."

Bans
On October 16, 2007, the game was refused classification by Australia's federal classification board, the Office of Film & Literature Classification (OFLC). This effectively banned the game throughout Australia as video games which have been refused OFLC classification cannot be sold, advertised or imported. Activision modified the game to meet OFLC standards and it was re-classified with an MA15+ rating. This version does not include radical violence; dismemberment has been completely removed. Activision released the modified game in Australia on April 23, 2008.

Soldier of Fortune: Payback was banned in Germany due to its high amount of violence.

References

External links
 

2007 video games
Activision games
Censored video games
First-person shooters
PlayStation 3 games
Video game sequels
Video games based on literature
Video games developed in Slovakia
Video games set in Afghanistan
Video games set in Iraq
Video games set in Myanmar
Video games set in South Africa
Video games set in Ukraine
Video games using Havok
Windows games
Xbox 360 games